is a manga series, written by Mann Izawa and illustrated by Yumiko Igarashi. It was serialized from 1982 to 1984 in the Shōjo Comic manga magazine.

The series was adapted in 1983 into an anime television series, by Tokyo Movie Shinsha, which originally premiered across TV Asahi and spanned 45 episodes.

A different English dub of the series has been show in Southeast Asia. In 1998 and 2011–2012, it was shown on ABS-CBN and in via anime cable channel Animax. In 2017 a digitally remastered version was shown ABS-CBN Digital TV subchannel Yey! in the Philippines.

Story
Georgie is a charming, lively girl who grew up in Australia. She is very much loved by her father and adored by her two brothers, Abel and Arthur. Her mother, on the other hand, seems to harbor resentment over Georgie especially after the death of her father, for which she is blamed. Growing up, Georgie noticed her hair color is different from those of her family. While everyone else had brunette hair, hers is blonde. Eventually, the mother broke the news to her that she was not part of the family and was actually adopted. A gold bracelet is her only clue to the past. After gaining some information of her birth parents who are British, she decided to go to London to find more about her past. She was willingly accompanied by her brothers. Both brothers were secretly in love with her but had been trying to keep it because she is their adoptive sister. Apart from wanting to learn about her parents, Georgie also has another goal, which is to find her lost love, Lowell, who had left Australia and moved to London some years ago. Along with her brothers, Georgie experiences both the kindness and cruelty of the real world in London, England.

The story progresses with her search for her real family along with the love triangle that develops between her adoptive brothers as well as Lowell.

The end of the plot drastically changes and is different from the manga series in which it has been based on. While in the animated series there is a happy and quite ambiguous ending the manga has a more dramatic ending.

In both media, the story is the same from the beginning (except for minor details) but near the point of ending it changes when Georgie is forced to leave her first love, Lowell because of his tuberculosis, which can be healed only by an expensive operation that they can't pay because of lack of money.

Anime
In the anime series after Georgie leaves Lowell because of his illness to Elisa (his promised wife from a rich family). She then reunited with her brother Abel while Arthur was kept captive by the Duke of Dangering, a nobleman who leads an illegal drug trafficking in London. The same man accused Georgie's father of the attempted murder of the Duke. Because of this accusation, Georgie's father was deported to Australia with his family. They have successfully rescued Arthur with the help of Fritz and the Duke's daughter, Mary who fell in love with Arthur. Although Dangering's son Arwin, the sadistic man who tortured Arthur during his imprisonment, tried to stop them, he died by falling from his horse during the pursuit. Arthur informed the Queen about the criminal offenses of Dangering and for this, the Duke was arrested while Georgie's father was absolved from all accusations. Georgie then decided to return to her home in Australia with her brothers before saying goodbye to her father and Lowell who is now officially married to Elisa.

Manga
In the manga, the pursuit ends in a different way. Georgie and Abel managed to rescue Arthur although the boy is mentally tested by the drugs which Arwin used on him to keep him quiet during imprisonment in Dangering mansion. He then committed suicide by throwing himself in the river Thames. Meanwhile, Abel who substituted himself for Arthur to rescue his brother is unmasked by Arwin who is killed by Abel. The boy is accused of murder by Arwin's father and is arrested and condemned to death by shooting. Georgie went to visit him in prison where the two finally discovered their feelings for one another and made love. Georgie's father tried to help Abel who revealed Dangering's crimes during his execution, but the duke grabbed a gun and shoot him. Abel dies in Georgie's arms while Dangering was executed for shooting Abel.  Some months later Georgie found out that she is pregnant with Abel's son. She decided that they will return to Australia where she discovered that Arthur is alive and didn't drown in the river Thames as previously believed. He was rescued by a fishing boat and returned to Australia. The manga ended with the three of them talking and playing in a big field. It is implied that they will live together as a family and rekindle their memory of Abel.

Anime

Cast
 Georgie: Yuriko Yamamoto
 Arthur: Reiko Kitō (young) / Isao Nagahisa (adult)
 Abel: Eiko Yamada (young) / Hideyuki Hori (adult)
 Kevin: Kyōsuke Maki
 Mother: Miyuki Ueda
 Royal (Lowell J. Grey): Yūji Mitsuya
 Narrator: Yasuko Endō (遠藤泰子, not to be confused with Yasuko Endō/遠藤康子)

Staff
Story: Mann Izawa
Art: Yumiko Igarashi
Script: Hiroshi Kaneko, Senhito Asakura, Noboru Shiroyama
Art director: Junzaburo Takahata
Music: Takeo Watanabe

Theme songs
OP:  (Lyrics: Kazuya Senke, composition: Takeo Watanabe, arrangement: Nozomi Aoki, performance: Yuriko Yamamoto)
ED:  (Lyrics: Mann Izawa, composition: Takeo Watanabe, arrangement: Nozomi Aoki, performance: Yuriko Yamamoto)

Insert songs
 (Lyrics: Kazuya Senke, composition: Takeo Watanabe, arrangement: Nozomi Aoki, performance: Yuriko Yamamoto)
 (Lyrics: Toyohisa Araki, composition: Takeo Watanabe, arrangement: Nozomi Aoki, performance: Yuriko Yamamoto)
 (Lyrics: Kouichi Hino, composition: Takeo Watanabe, arrangement: Takeo Watanabe, performance: Yuriko Yamamoto)
 (Lyrics: Mann Izawa, composition: Takeo Watanabe, arrangement: Nozomi Aoki, performance: Yuriko Yamamoto)

Episodes
 The Bracelet's Secret
 Daddy Promised
 The Lezard's Island
 Daddy Stay with Us
 Will They Sell the Farm?
 Children's Dreams
 The Bracelet Lost
 Sister Katie
 The Other Abel
 Happy Birthday Mother
 An Unexpected Visit
 Georgie's New Room
 Abel is Jealous
 The Wolves
 Bettie the Vermin
 The Birthday Dinner
 Kim Finds a Bride
 The Gentleman
 Georgie the Dressmaker
 Abel's Going Away
 Blue as the Sky
 Abel is Back
 The Railroad
 First Kiss
 The Secret Revealed
 A Night of Storm
 Georgie's Sadness
 A Cruel Dilemma
 Georgie's Decision
 Mother's Death
 Towards England
 Three Ships
 The Terrible Piege
 The Reunion
 Dreams and Tears
 The Blind
 Abel's Judgement
 The Duke's Menaces
 The Debutants' Ball
 The Fear
 Georgie Sells the Bracelet
 The Sacrifice
 Farewell Laurent
 Father
 The Nightmare's End

External links
Animax's official website for Lady Georgie 
TMS Official page 

1982 manga
1983 anime television series debuts
Comics set in Australia
Drama anime and manga
Romance anime and manga
Historical anime and manga
Shogakukan manga
Shōjo manga
Television shows set in Australia
TMS Entertainment